John W. Morris (September 10, 1921 – August 20, 2013) was an American lieutenant general who became Chief of Engineers.

Morris was born in Princess Anne, Maryland. He graduated from the United States Military Academy in June 1943 and was commissioned in the Corps of Engineers. During World War II he commanded an airfield construction company in the Western Pacific. After the war he served in the Philippines and Japan, in the Corps' Savannah District, and as area engineer at Goose Bay, Labrador.

In 1960–62 he commanded the divisional 8th Engineer Battalion in Korea. Morris headed the Corps' Tulsa District in 1962–65 as it improved navigation on the Arkansas River. During the peak years of the Vietnam War, he was the Army's Deputy Chief of Legislative Liaison (1967–69), and he commanded the 18th Engineer Brigade in Vietnam (1969–70). He was then Missouri River Division Engineer for two years, the Corps' Director of Civil Works for three years, and Deputy Chief of Engineers in 1975–76. As Chief of Engineers, Morris convinced the Army to include the Corps of Engineers among its major commands. Morris obtained a master's degree in civil engineering from the University of Iowa. He died in 2013, aged 91.

Awards and decorations
His military awards included the Distinguished Service Medal, the Legion of Merit with three Oak Leaf Clusters, the Bronze Star  and the Defense Meritorious Service Medal. General Morris was selected Construction's Man of the Year for 1977 by the Engineering News-Record for his work to oversee $17 billion in construction in Saudi Arabia. In 1996, he received the Carroll H. Dunn Award of Excellence from the Construction Industry Institute.

  Army Distinguished Service Medal
  Legion of Merit with three oak leaf clusters
  Bronze Star
  Defense Meritorious Service Medal

References

This article contains public domain text from 

1921 births
2013 deaths
Military personnel from Maryland
United States Army generals
United States Military Academy alumni
Recipients of the Distinguished Service Medal (US Army)
Recipients of the Legion of Merit
Recipients of the Silver Star
United States Army Corps of Engineers personnel
People from Princess Anne, Maryland
United States Army personnel of World War II
American expatriates in the Philippines
American expatriates in Japan